Marie Luise Droop (15 January 1890 – 22 August 1959) was a German writer, director and producer.

Biography
Marie Martha Luise Fritsch was born on 15 January 1890 in Stettin. Her father was Karl Georg Fritsch, manager of a cement factory, her mother Emmeline Albertine Elisabeth Conradine Most, from a wealthy family of chocolate manufacturers. As a child she admired Karl May and founded a Karl May fanclub. In 1903 she sent May a letter and became his close friend until his death in 1912.

She married Dr. Adolf Droop, a teacher who had written about May's work. Marie Luise Droop worked as an editor for Ullstein Verlag. During World War I, when her husband served in the army, she moved to Denmark where she worked for Nordisk Film. She returned to Germany after the war.

1920 She co-founded Ustad Film with the aim to produce Karl May adaptations. Ustad Film produced Die Teufelsanbeter, Auf den Trümmern des Paradieses and Die Todeskarawane until it went bankrupt. All three films are considered lost.

Marie Luise Droop wrote almost 50 screenplays for silent movies (three were adaptations of May's work) and, speaking nine languages, worked as a translator.

Marie Luise Droop died on 22 August 1959 in Lahr.

Filmography
(incomplete)

Notes and references

External links
 

German women screenwriters
1890 births
1959 deaths
20th-century German screenwriters